Warnock is an unincorporated community in northern Smith Township, Belmont County, Ohio, United States.  It has a post office with the ZIP code 43967.  It lies along State Route 9.

Warnock is part of the Wheeling, WV-OH Metropolitan Statistical Area.

History
A former variant name was Warnocks Station. A post office called Warnock has been in operation since 1857. The community was named for the Warnock family, the original owners of the town site.

References

Unincorporated communities in Belmont County, Ohio
1857 establishments in Ohio
Populated places established in 1857
Unincorporated communities in Ohio